Ranpur railway station  is a railway station serving in Botad district of Gujarat State of India. It is under Bhavnagar railway division of Western Railway Zone of Indian Railways. Passenger and Superfast trains halt here.

Major trains 

Following major trains halt at Ranpur railway station in both direction:

 12971/72 Bhavnagar Terminus - Bandra Terminus Superfast Express
 19579/80 Bhavnagar Terminus - Delhi Sarai Rohilla Link Express

See also
Bhavnagar State Railway

References

Railway stations in Botad district
Bhavnagar railway division